Emperor , commonly known in English-speaking countries by his personal name , was the 124th emperor of Japan, ruling from 25 December 1926 until his death in 1989. Hirohito and his wife, Nagako, had two sons and five daughters; he was succeeded by his fifth child and eldest son, Akihito. By 1979, Hirohito was the only monarch in the world with the title "Emperor". He was the longest-reigning historical Japanese emperor and one of the longest-reigning monarchs in the world.

Hirohito was the head of state under the Meiji Constitution during Japan's imperial expansion, militarization, and involvement in World War II. Japan waged a war across Asia in the 1930s and 40s in the name of Hirohito, who was revered as a god. After Japan's surrender, he was not prosecuted for war crimes, as General Douglas MacArthur thought that an ostensibly cooperative emperor would help establish a peaceful Allied occupation, and help the U.S. achieve their postwar objectives. His role during the war remains controversial. On 1 January 1946, under pressure from the Allies, the Emperor formally renounced his divinity.
The Constitution of Japan of 1947 declared the Emperor to be a mere "symbol of the State ... deriving his position from the will of the people in whom resides sovereign power."

In Japan, the emperor is never referred to by his given name; reigning emperors are known only as "the Emperor". Hirohito is now referred to in Japanese by his posthumous name, Shōwa, which is the name of the era coinciding with his reign.

Early life

Hirohito was born in Tokyo's Aoyama Palace (during the reign of his grandfather, Emperor Meiji) on 29 April 1901, the first son of 21-year-old Crown prince Yoshihito (the future Emperor Taishō) and 17-year-old Crown Princess Sadako (the future Empress Teimei). He was the grandson of Emperor Meiji and Yanagiwara Naruko. His childhood title was Prince Michi.

Ten weeks after he was born, Hirohito was removed from the court and placed in the care of Count Kawamura Sumiyoshi, who raised him as his grandchild. At the age of 3, Hirohito and his brother Yasuhito were returned to court when Kawamura died – first to the imperial mansion in Numazu, Shizuoka, then back to the Aoyama Palace.

In 1908, he began elementary studies at the Gakushūin (Peers School). During 1912, at age 11, Hirohito was commissioned into the Imperial Japanese Army as a Second Lieutenant and in the Imperial Japanese Navy as an Ensign. He was also bestowed with the Grand Cordon of the Order of the Chrysanthemum. When his grandfather, Emperor Meiji, died on 30 July 1912, Hirohito's father, Yoshihito, assumed the throne.

Shiratori Kurakichi was one of the personalities who deeply influenced the life of Hirohito. Kurakichi was a trained historian from Germany, imbibing the positivist historiographic trend by Leopold von Ranke. He was the one who inculcated in the mind of the young Hirohito that there is a connection between the divine origin of the imperial line and the aspiration of linking it to the myth of the racial superiority and homogeneity of the Japanese. The emperors were often a driving force in the modernization of their country. He taught Hirohito that the empire of Japan was done through diplomatic actions (taking into accounts the interests of other nations benevolently and justly).

Crown Prince era
On 2 November 1916, Hirohito was formally proclaimed crown prince and heir apparent. An investiture ceremony was not required to confirm this status.

Overseas travel

From 3 March to 3 September 1921 (Taisho 10), the Crown Prince made official visits to the United Kingdom, France, the Netherlands, Belgium, Italy and Vatican City. This was the first visit to Western Europe by the Crown Prince. Despite strong opposition in Japan, this was realized by the efforts of elder Japanese statesmen (Genrō) such as Yamagata Aritomo and Saionji Kinmochi.

The departure of Prince Hirohito was widely reported in newspapers. The Japanese battleship Katori was used and departed from Yokohama, sailed to Naha, Hong Kong, Singapore, Colombo, Suez, Cairo, and Gibraltar. It arrived in Portsmouth two months later on 9 May, and on the same day they reached the British capital London. He was welcomed in the UK as a partner of the Anglo-Japanese Alliance and met with King George V and Prime Minister David Lloyd George. That evening, a banquet was held at Buckingham Palace and a meeting with George V and Prince Arthur of Connaught. George V said that he treated his father like Hirohito, who was nervous in an unfamiliar foreign country, and that relieved his tension. The next day, he met Prince Edward (the future Edward VIII) at Windsor Castle, and a banquet was held every day thereafter. In London, he toured the British Museum, Tower of London, Bank of England, Lloyd's Marine Insurance, Oxford University, Army University, and Naval War College. He also enjoyed theater at the New Oxford Theatre and the Delhi Theatre. At Cambridge University, he listened to Professor J. R. Tanner's lecture on "Relationship between the British Royal Family and its People" and was awarded an honorary doctorate degree. He visited Edinburgh, Scotland, from the 19th to the 20th, and was also awarded an Honorary Doctor of Laws at the University of Edinburgh. He stayed at the residence of John Stewart-Murray, 8th Duke of Atholl, for three days. On his stay with Stuart-Murray, the prince was quoted as saying, "The rise of Bolsheviks won't happen if you live a simple life like Duke Athol."

In Italy, he met with King Vittorio Emanuele III and others, attended official banquets in various countries, and visited places such as the fierce battlefields of World War I.

Regency

After returning to Japan, Hirohito became Regent of Japan (Sesshō) on 25 November 1921, in place of his ailing father, who was affected by mental illness.  In 1923 he was promoted to the rank of Lieutenant-Colonel in the army and Commander in the navy, and army Colonel and Navy Captain in 1925.

During Hirohito's regency, many important events occurred:

In the Four-Power Treaty on Insular Possessions signed on 13 December 1921, Japan, the United States, Britain, and France agreed to recognize the status quo in the Pacific. Japan and Britain agreed to end the Anglo-Japanese Alliance. The Washington Naval Treaty limiting warship numbers was signed on 6 February 1922. Japan withdrew troops from the Siberian Intervention on 28 August 1922. The Great Kantō earthquake devastated Tokyo on 1 September 1923. On 27 December 1923, Daisuke Namba attempted to assassinate Hirohito in the Toranomon Incident, but his attempt failed. During interrogation, he claimed to be a communist and was executed.

Marriage

Prince Hirohito married his distant cousin Princess Nagako Kuni, the eldest daughter of Prince Kuniyoshi Kuni, on 26 January 1924. They had two sons and five daughters (see Issue).

The daughters who lived to adulthood left the imperial family as a result of the American reforms of the Japanese imperial household in October 1947 (in the case of Princess Shigeko) or under the terms of the Imperial Household Law at the moment of their subsequent marriages (in the cases of Princesses Kazuko, Atsuko, and Takako).

Accession

On 25 December 1926, Hirohito assumed the throne upon the death of his father, Yoshihito. The Crown Prince was said to have received the succession (senso). The Taishō era's end and the Shōwa era's beginning (Enlightened Peace) were proclaimed. The deceased Emperor was posthumously renamed Emperor Taishō within days. Following Japanese custom, the new Emperor was never referred to by his given name but rather was referred to simply as "His Majesty the Emperor" which may be shortened to "His Majesty." In writing, the Emperor was also referred to formally as "The Reigning Emperor."

In November 1928, the Emperor's accession was confirmed in ceremonies (sokui) which are conventionally identified as "enthronement" and "coronation" (Shōwa no tairei-shiki); but this formal event would have been more accurately described as a public confirmation that he possessed the Japanese Imperial Regalia, also called the Three Sacred Treasures, which have been handed down through the centuries. However his enthronment were planned and staged under the economic conditions of a recession whereas the 55th Imperial Diet unanimously passed $7,360,000 for the festivities.

Early reign

The first part of Hirohito's reign took place against a background of financial crisis and increasing military power within the government through both legal and extralegal means. The Imperial Japanese Army and Imperial Japanese Navy held veto power over the formation of cabinets since 1900. Between 1921 and 1944, there were 64 separate incidents of political violence.

Hirohito narrowly escaped assassination by a hand grenade thrown by a Korean independence activist, Lee Bong-chang, in Tokyo on 9 January 1932, in the Sakuradamon Incident.

Another notable case was the assassination of moderate Prime Minister Inukai Tsuyoshi in 1932, marking the end of civilian control of the military. The February 26 incident, an attempted military coup, followed in February 1936. It was carried out by junior Army officers of the Kōdōha faction who had the sympathy of many high-ranking officers including Yasuhito, Prince Chichibu, one of the Emperor's brothers. This revolt was occasioned by a loss of political support by the militarist faction in Diet elections. The coup resulted in the murders of several high government and Army officials.

When Chief Aide-de-camp Shigeru Honjō informed him of the revolt, the Emperor immediately ordered that it be put down and referred to the officers as "rebels" (bōto). Shortly thereafter, he ordered Army Minister Yoshiyuki Kawashima to suppress the rebellion within the hour. He asked for reports from Honjō every 30 minutes. The next day, when told by Honjō that the high command had made little progress in quashing the rebels, the Emperor told him "I Myself, will lead the Konoe Division and subdue them." The rebellion was suppressed following his orders on 29 February.

Second Sino-Japanese War

Starting from the Mukden Incident in 1931 in which Japan staged a False flag operation and made a false accusation against Chinese dissidents as a pretext to invade Manchuria, Japan occupied Chinese territories and established puppet governments. Such aggression was recommended to Hirohito by his chiefs of staff and prime minister Fumimaro Konoe and Hirohito did not voice objection to the invasion of China. A diary by chamberlain Kuraji Ogura says that he was reluctant to start war against China in 1937 because they had underestimated China's military strength and Japan should be cautious in its strategy. In this regard, Ogura writes Hirohito said that "once you start (a war), it cannot easily be stopped in the middle ... What's important is when to end the war" and "one should be cautious in starting a war, but once begun, it should be carried out thoroughly." Nonetheless, his main concern seems to have been the possibility of an attack by the Soviet Union in the north. His questions to his chief of staff, Prince Kan'in Kotohito, and minister of the army, Hajime Sugiyama, were mostly about the time it could take to crush Chinese resistance.

According to Akira Fujiwara, Hirohito endorsed the policy of qualifying the invasion of China as an "incident" instead of a "war"; therefore, he did not issue any notice to observe international law in this conflict (unlike what his predecessors did in previous conflicts officially recognized by Japan as wars), and the Deputy Minister of the Japanese Army instructed the chief of staff of Japanese China Garrison Army on 5 August not to use the term "prisoners of war" for Chinese captives. This instruction led to the removal of the constraints of international law on the treatment of Chinese prisoners. The works of Yoshiaki Yoshimi and Seiya Matsuno show that the Emperor also authorized, by specific orders (rinsanmei), the use of chemical weapons against the Chinese. During the invasion of Wuhan, from August to October 1938, the Emperor authorized the use of toxic gas on 375 separate occasions, despite the resolution adopted by the League of Nations on 14 May condemning Japanese use of toxic gas.

World War II

Preparations
In July 1939, the Emperor quarrelled with his brother, Prince Chichibu, over whether to support the Anti-Comintern Pact, and reprimanded the army minister, Seishirō Itagaki. But after the success of the Wehrmacht in Europe, the Emperor consented to the alliance. On 27 September 1940, ostensibly under Hirohito's leadership, Japan became a contracting partner of the Tripartite Pact with Germany and Italy forming the Axis Powers.

The objectives to be obtained were clearly defined: a free hand to continue with the conquest of China and Southeast Asia, no increase in US or British military forces in the region, and cooperation by the West "in the acquisition of goods needed by our Empire."

On 5 September, Prime Minister Konoe informally submitted a draft of the decision to the Emperor, just one day in advance of the Imperial Conference at which it would be formally implemented. On this evening, the Emperor had a meeting with the chief of staff of the army, Sugiyama, chief of staff of the navy, Osami Nagano, and Prime Minister Konoe. The Emperor questioned Sugiyama about the chances of success of an open war with the Occident. As Sugiyama answered positively, the Emperor scolded him:

Chief of Naval General Staff Admiral Nagano, a former Navy Minister and vastly experienced, later told a trusted colleague, "I have never seen the Emperor reprimand us in such a manner, his face turning red and raising his voice."

Nevertheless, all speakers at the Imperial Conference were united in favor of war rather than diplomacy. Baron Yoshimichi Hara, President of the Imperial Council and the Emperor's representative, then questioned them closely, producing replies to the effect that war would be considered only as a last resort from some, and silence from others.

On 8 October, Sugiyama signed a 47-page report to the Emperor (sōjōan) outlining in minute detail plans for the advance into Southeast Asia. During the third week of October, Sugiyama gave the Emperor a 51-page document, "Materials in Reply to the Throne," about the operational outlook for the war.

As war preparations continued, Prime Minister Fumimaro Konoe found himself increasingly isolated, and he resigned on 16 October. He justified himself to his chief cabinet secretary, Kenji Tomita, by stating:

The army and the navy recommended the appointment of Prince Naruhiko Higashikuni, one of the Emperor's uncles, as prime minister. According to the Shōwa "Monologue", written after the war, the Emperor then said that if the war were to begin while a member of the imperial house was prime minister, the imperial house would have to carry the responsibility and he was opposed to this.

Instead, the Emperor chose the hard-line General Hideki Tōjō, who was known for his devotion to the imperial institution, and asked him to make a policy review of what had been sanctioned by the Imperial Conferences. On 2 November Tōjō, Sugiyama, and Nagano reported to the Emperor that the review of eleven points had been in vain. Emperor Hirohito gave his consent to the war and then asked: "Are you going to provide justification for the war?" The decision for war against the United States was presented for approval to Hirohito by General Tōjō, Naval Minister Admiral Shigetarō Shimada, and Japanese Foreign Minister Shigenori Tōgō.

On 3 November, Nagano explained in detail the plan of the attack on Pearl Harbor to the Emperor. On 5 November Emperor Hirohito approved in imperial conference the operations plan for a war against the Occident and had many meetings with the military and Tōjō until the end of the month. On 25 November Henry L. Stimson, United States Secretary of War, noted in his diary that he had discussed with US President Franklin D. Roosevelt the severe likelihood that Japan was about to launch a surprise attack and that the question had been "how we should maneuver them [the Japanese] into the position of firing the first shot without allowing too much danger to ourselves."

On the following day, 26 November 1941, US Secretary of State Cordell Hull presented the Japanese ambassador with the Hull note, which as one of its conditions demanded the complete withdrawal of all Japanese troops from French Indochina and China. Japanese Prime Minister Hideki Tojo said to his cabinet, "This is an ultimatum." On 1 December an Imperial Conference sanctioned the "War against the United States, United Kingdom and the Kingdom of the Netherlands."

War: advance and retreat
On 8 December (7 December in Hawaii), 1941, in simultaneous attacks, Japanese forces struck at the Hong Kong Garrison, the US Fleet in Pearl Harbor and in the Philippines, and began the invasion of Malaya.

With the nation fully committed to the war, the Emperor took a keen interest in military progress and sought to boost morale. According to Akira Yamada and Akira Fujiwara, the Emperor made major interventions in some military operations. For example, he pressed Sugiyama four times, on 13 and 21 January and 9 and 26 February, to increase troop strength and launch an attack on Bataan. On 9 February 19 March, and 29 May, the Emperor ordered the Army Chief of staff to examine the possibilities for an attack on Chungking in China, which led to Operation Gogo.

As the tide of war began to turn against Japan (around late 1942 and early 1943), the flow of information to the palace gradually began to bear less and less relation to reality, while others suggest that the Emperor worked closely with Prime Minister Hideki Tojo, continued to be well and accurately briefed by the military, and knew Japan's military position precisely right up to the point of surrender. The chief of staff of the General Affairs section of the Prime Minister's office, Shuichi Inada, remarked to Tōjō's private secretary, Sadao Akamatsu:

In the first six months of war, all the major engagements had been victories. Japanese advances were stopped in the summer of 1942 with the battle of Midway and the landing of the American forces on Guadalcanal and Tulagi in August. The emperor played an increasingly influential role in the war; in eleven major episodes he was deeply involved in supervising the actual conduct of war operations. Hirohito pressured the High Command to order an early attack on the Philippines in 1941–42, including the fortified Bataan peninsula. He secured the deployment of army air power in the Guadalcanal campaign. Following Japan's withdrawal from Guadalcanal he demanded a new offensive in New Guinea, which was duly carried out but failed badly. Unhappy with the navy's conduct of the war, he criticized its withdrawal from the central Solomon Islands and demanded naval battles against the Americans for the losses they had inflicted in the Aleutians. The battles were disasters. Finally, it was at his insistence that plans were drafted for the recapture of Saipan and, later, for an offensive in the Battle of Okinawa.  With the Army and Navy bitterly feuding, he settled disputes over the allocation of resources. He helped plan military offenses.

The media, under tight government control, repeatedly portrayed him as lifting the popular morale even as the Japanese cities came under heavy air attack in 1944–45 and food and housing shortages mounted.  Japanese retreats and defeats were celebrated by the media as successes that portended "Certain Victory." Only gradually did it become apparent to the Japanese people that the situation was very grim due to growing shortages of food, medicine, and fuel as U.S submarines began wiping out Japanese shipping. Starting in mid 1944, American raids on the major cities of Japan made a mockery of the unending tales of victory. Later that year, with the downfall of Tojo's government, two other prime ministers were appointed to continue the war effort, Kuniaki Koiso and Kantarō Suzuki—each with the formal approval of the Emperor. Both were unsuccessful and Japan was nearing disaster.

Surrender

In early 1945, in the wake of the losses in the Battle of Leyte, Emperor Hirohito began a series of individual meetings with senior government officials to consider the progress of the war. All but ex-Prime Minister Fumimaro Konoe advised continuing the war. Konoe feared a communist revolution even more than defeat in war and urged a negotiated surrender. In February 1945, during the first private audience with the Emperor he had been allowed in three years, Konoe advised Hirohito to begin negotiations to end the war. According to Grand Chamberlain Hisanori Fujita, the Emperor, still looking for a tennozan (a great victory) in order to provide a stronger bargaining position, firmly rejected Konoe's recommendation.

With each passing week victory became less likely. In April, the Soviet Union issued notice that it would not renew its neutrality agreement. Japan's ally Germany surrendered in early May 1945. In June, the cabinet reassessed the war strategy, only to decide more firmly than ever on a fight to the last man. This strategy was officially affirmed at a brief Imperial Council meeting, at which, as was normal, the Emperor did not speak.

The following day, Lord Keeper of the Privy Seal Kōichi Kido prepared a draft document which summarized the hopeless military situation and proposed a negotiated settlement. Extremists in Japan were also calling for a death-before-dishonor mass suicide, modeled on the "47 Ronin" incident. By mid-June 1945, the cabinet had agreed to approach the Soviet Union to act as a mediator for a negotiated surrender but not before Japan's bargaining position had been improved by repulse of the anticipated Allied invasion of mainland Japan.

On 22 June, the Emperor met with his ministers saying, "I desire that concrete plans to end the war, unhampered by existing policy, be speedily studied and that efforts be made to implement them." The attempt to negotiate a peace via the Soviet Union came to nothing. There was always the threat that extremists would carry out a coup or foment other violence. On 26 July 1945, the Allies issued the Potsdam Declaration demanding unconditional surrender. The Japanese government council, the Big Six, considered that option and recommended to the Emperor that it be accepted only if one to four conditions were agreed upon, including a guarantee of the Emperor's continued position in Japanese society. The Emperor decided not to surrender.

That changed after the atomic bombings of Hiroshima and Nagasaki and the Soviet declaration of war. On 9 August, Emperor Hirohito told Kōichi Kido: "The Soviet Union has declared war and today began hostilities against us." On 10 August, the cabinet drafted an "Imperial Rescript ending the War" following the Emperor's indications that the declaration did not compromise any demand which prejudiced his prerogatives as a sovereign ruler.

On 12 August 1945, the Emperor informed the imperial family of his decision to surrender. One of his uncles, Prince Yasuhiko Asaka, asked whether the war would be continued if the kokutai (national polity) could not be preserved. The Emperor simply replied "Of course." On 14 August the Suzuki government notified the Allies that it had accepted the Potsdam Declaration.

On 15 August, a recording of the Emperor's surrender speech ("Gyokuon-hōsō", literally "broadcast in the Emperor's voice") was broadcast over the radio (the first time the Emperor was heard on the radio by the Japanese people) announcing Japan's acceptance of the Potsdam Declaration. During the historic broadcast the Emperor stated: "Moreover, the enemy has begun to employ a new and most cruel bomb, the power of which to do damage is, indeed, incalculable, taking the toll of many innocent lives. Should we continue to fight, not only would it result in an ultimate collapse and obliteration of the Japanese nation, but also it would lead to the total extinction of human civilization." The speech also noted that "the war situation has developed not necessarily to Japan's advantage" and ordered the Japanese to "endure the unendurable." The speech, using formal, archaic Japanese, was not readily understood by many commoners. According to historian Richard Storry in A History of Modern Japan, the Emperor typically used "a form of language familiar only to the well-educated" and to the more traditional samurai families.

A faction of the army opposed to the surrender attempted a coup d'état on the evening of 14 August, prior to the broadcast. They seized the Imperial Palace (the Kyūjō incident), but the physical recording of the emperor's speech was hidden and preserved overnight. The coup failed, and the speech was broadcast the next morning.

In his first ever press conference given in Tokyo in 1975, when he was asked what he thought of the bombing of Hiroshima, the Emperor answered: "It's very regrettable that nuclear bombs were dropped and I feel sorry for the citizens of Hiroshima but it couldn't be helped because that happened in wartime" (shikata ga nai, meaning "it cannot be helped").

After the Japanese surrender in August 1945, there was a large amount of pressure that came from both Allied countries and Japanese leftists that demanded the emperor step down and be indicted as a war criminal. The Australian government listed Hirohito as a war criminal, and intended to put him on trial.  General Douglas MacArthur did not like the idea, as he thought that an ostensibly cooperating emperor would help establish a peaceful allied occupation regime in Japan. As a result, any possible evidence that would incriminate the emperor and his family were excluded from the International Military Tribunal for the Far East. MacArthur created a plan that separated the emperor from the militarists, retained the emperor as a constitutional monarch but only as a figurehead, and used the emperor to retain control over Japan and help achieve American postwar objectives in Japan.

Accountability for Japanese war crimes
The issue of Emperor Hirohito's war responsibility is contested. During the war, the Allies frequently depicted Hirohito to equate with Hitler and Mussolini as the three Axis dictators. After the war, since the U.S. thought that the retention of the emperor would help establish a peaceful allied occupation regime in Japan, and help the U.S. achieve their postwar objectives, they depicted Hirohito as a "powerless figurehead" without any implication in wartime policies. This was the dominant postwar narrative until his death in 1989. After Hirohito's death, historians argued that Hirohito wielded more power than previously believed, and he was actively involved in the decision to launch the war as well as in other political and military decisions before. Over the years, as new evidence surfaced, historians were able to arrive at the conclusion that he was culpable for the war, and was reflecting on his wartime role. Some evidence shows that Hirohito had some involvement, but his power was limited by cabinet members, ministers and other people of the military oligarchy.

Evidence for wartime culpability

Some historians contend that Hirohito was directly responsible for the atrocities committed by the imperial forces in the Second Sino-Japanese War and in World War II. They argued that he and some members of the imperial family, such as his brother Prince Chichibu, his cousins the princes Takeda and Fushimi, and his uncles the princes Kan'in, Asaka, and Higashikuni, should have been tried for war crimes. In a study published in 1996, historian Mitsuyoshi Himeta claims that the Three Alls Policy (Sankō Sakusen), a Japanese scorched earth policy adopted in China and sanctioned by Emperor Hirohito himself, was both directly and indirectly responsible for the deaths of "more than 2.7 million" Chinese civilians. His works and those of Akira Fujiwara about the details of the operation were commented by Herbert P. Bix in his Hirohito and the Making of Modern Japan, who wrote that the Sankō Sakusen far surpassed Nanking Massacre not only in terms of numbers, but in brutality as well as "These military operations caused death and suffering on a scale incomparably greater than the totally unplanned orgy of killing in Nanking, which later came to symbolize the war". While the Nanking Massacre was unplanned, Bix said "Hirohito knew of and approved annihilation campaigns in China that included burning villages thought to harbor guerrillas."

The debate over Hirohito's responsibility for war crimes concerns how much real control the Emperor had over the Japanese military during the two wars. Officially, the imperial constitution, adopted under Emperor Meiji, gave full power to the Emperor. Article 4 prescribed that, "The Emperor is the head of the Empire, combining in Himself the rights of sovereignty, and exercises them, according to the provisions of the present Constitution." Likewise, according to article 6, "The Emperor gives sanction to laws and orders them to be promulgated and executed," and article 11, "The Emperor has the supreme command of the Army and the Navy." The Emperor was thus the leader of the Imperial General Headquarters.

Poison gas weapons, such as phosgene, were produced by Unit 731 and authorized by specific orders given by Hirohito himself, transmitted by the chief of staff of the army. For example, Hirohito authorized the use of toxic gas 375 times during the Battle of Wuhan from August to October 1938.

Historians such as Herbert Bix, Akira Fujiwara, Peter Wetzler, and Akira Yamada assert that post-war arguments favoring the view that Hirohito was a mere figurehead overlook the importance of numerous "behind the chrysanthemum curtain" meetings where the real decisions were made between the Emperor, his chiefs of staff, and the cabinet. Using primary sources and the monumental work of Shirō Hara as a basis, Fujiwara and Wetzler  have produced evidence suggesting that the Emperor worked through intermediaries to exercise a great deal of control over the military and was neither bellicose nor a pacifist but an opportunist who governed in a pluralistic decision-making process. American historian Herbert P. Bix goes so far as to argue that Emperor Hirohito might have been the prime mover behind most of Japan's military aggression during the Shōwa Era. 

The view promoted by the Imperial Palace and American occupation forces immediately after World War II portrayed Emperor Hirohito as a purely ceremonial figure who behaved strictly according to protocol while remaining at a distance from the decision-making processes. This view was endorsed by Prime Minister Noboru Takeshita in a speech on the day of Hirohito's death in which Takeshita asserted that the war "had broken out against [Hirohito's] wishes." Takeshita's statement provoked outrage in nations in East Asia and Commonwealth nations such as the United Kingdom, Canada, Australia, and New Zealand. According to historian Fujiwara, "The thesis that the Emperor, as an organ of responsibility, could not reverse cabinet decision is a myth fabricated after the war."

According to Yinan He, associate professor of international relations at Lehigh University, in the aftermath of the war, conservative Japanese elites created self-whitewashing, self-glorifying national myths that minimized the scope of Japan's war responsibility, which included presenting the emperor as a peace-seeking diplomat and a narrative that separated him from the militarists, whom they described as people who hijacked the Japanese government and led the country into war, shifting the responsibility from the ruling class to only a few military leaders. This narrative also narrowly focuses on the U.S.–Japan conflict, completely ignores the wars Japan waged in Asia, and disregards the atrocities committed by Japanese troops during the war. Japanese elites created the narrative in an attempt to avoid tarnishing the national image and regain the international acceptance of the country.

 argues that post-war Japanese public opinion supporting protection of the Emperor was influenced by U.S. propaganda promoting the view that the Emperor together with the Japanese people had been fooled by the military.

In the years immediately after Hirohito's death, scholars who spoke out against the emperor were threatened and attacked by right-wing extremists. Susan Chira reported, "Scholars who have spoken out against the late Emperor have received threatening phone calls from Japan's extremist right wing." One example of actual violence occurred in 1990 when the mayor of Nagasaki, Hitoshi Motoshima, was shot and critically wounded by a member of the ultranationalist group, Seikijuku. A year before, in 1989, Motoshima had broken what was characterized as "one of [Japan's] most sensitive taboos" by asserting that Emperor Hirohito bore responsibility for World War II.

Regarding Hirohito's exemption from trial before the International Military Tribunal of the Far East, opinions were not unanimous. Sir William Webb, the president of the tribunal, declared: "This immunity of the Emperor is contrasted with the part he played in launching the war in the Pacific, is, I think, a matter which the tribunal should take into consideration in imposing the sentences." Likewise, the French judge, Henri Bernard, wrote about Hirohito's accountability that the declaration of war by Japan "had a principal author who escaped all prosecution and of whom in any case the present defendants could only be considered accomplices."

An account from the Vice Interior Minister in 1941, Michio Yuzawa, asserts that Hirohito was "at ease" with the attack on Pearl Harbor "once he had made a decision."

In Japan, debate over the Emperor's responsibility was taboo while he was alive. After his death, however, debate began to surface over the extent of his involvement and thus his culpability. Since his death in 1989, historians have discovered evidence that prove Hirohito's culpability for the war, and that he was not a passive figurehead manipulated by those around him.

Michiji Tajima's notes in 1952
According to notebooks by Michiji Tajima, a top Imperial Household Agency official who took office after the war, Emperor Hirohito privately expressed regret about the atrocities that were committed by Japanese troops during the Nanjing Massacre. In addition to feeling remorseful about his own role in the war, he "fell short by allowing radical elements of the military to drive the conduct of the war."

Vice Interior Minister Yuzawa's account on Hirohito's role in Pearl Harbor raid
In late July 2018, the bookseller Takeo Hatano, an acquaintance of the descendants of Michio Yuzawa (Japanese Vice Interior Minister in 1941), released to Japan's Yomiuri Shimbun newspaper a memo by Yuzawa that Hatano had kept for nine years since he received it from Yuzawa's family. The bookseller said: "It took me nine years to come forward, as I was afraid of a backlash. But now I hope the memo would help us figure out what really happened during the war, in which 3.1 million people were killed."

Takahisa Furukawa, expert on wartime history from Nihon University, confirmed the authenticity of the memo, calling it "the first look at the thinking of Emperor Hirohito and Prime Minister Hideki Tojo on the eve of the Japanese attack on Pearl Harbor."

In this document, Yuzawa details a conversation he had with Tojo a few hours before the attack. The Vice Minister quotes Tojo saying:

Historian Furukawa concluded from Yuzawa's memo:

Shinobu Kobayashi's diary
Shinobu Kobayashi was the Emperor's chamberlain from April 1974 until June 2000. Kobayashi kept a diary with near-daily remarks of Hirohito for 26 years. It was made public on Wednesday 22 August 2018. According to Takahisa Furukawa, a professor of modern Japanese history at Nihon University, the diary reveals that the emperor “gravely took responsibility for the war for a long time, and as he got older, that feeling became stronger.”

Jennifer Lind, associate professor of government at Dartmouth College and a specialist in Japanese war memory said:

An entry dated 27 May 1980 said the Emperor wanted to express his regret about the Sino-Japanese war to former Chinese Premier Hua Guofeng who visited at the time, but was stopped by senior members of the Imperial Household Agency due to fear of backlash from far right groups.

An entry dated 7 April 1987 said the Emperor was haunted by discussions of his wartime responsibility and, as a result, was losing his will to live.

Hirohito's preparations for war described in Saburō Hyakutake's diary
In September 2021, 25 diaries, pocket notebooks and memos by Saburō Hyakutake (Emperor Hirohito's Grand Chamberlain from 1936 to 1944) deposited by his relatives to the library of the University of Tokyo's graduate schools for law and politics became available to the public.

Hyakutake's diary quotes some Hirohito's ministers and advisers worried that the Emperor was getting ahead of them in terms of battle preparations.

Thus, Hyakutake quotes Tsuneo Matsudaira, the Imperial Household Minister, saying:

Likewise, Koichi Kido, Lord Keeper of the Privy Seal, is quoted as saying:

Seiichi Chadani, professor of modern Japanese history with Shigakukan University who has studied Hirohito's actions before and during the war said on the discovery of Hyakutake's diary:

Documents that suggest limited wartime responsibility 

The declassified January 1989 British government assessment of Hirohito describes him as "too weak to alter the course of events" and Hirohito was "powerless" and comparisons with Hitler are "ridiculously wide off the mark." Hirohito's power was limited by ministers and the military and if he asserted his views too much he would have been replaced by another member of the royal family.

Indian jurist Radhabinod Pal opposed the International Military Tribunal and made a 1,235-page judgment. He found the entire prosecution case to be weak regarding the conspiracy to commit an act of aggressive war with brutalization and subjugation of conquered nations. Pal said there is "no evidence, testimonial or circumstantial, concomitant, prospectant, restrospectant, that would in any way lead to the inference that the government in any way permitted the commission of such offenses". He added that conspiracy to wage aggressive war was not illegal in 1937, or at any point since. Pal supported the acquittal of all of the defendants. He considered the Japanese military operations as justified, because Chiang Kai-shek supported the boycott of trade operations by the Western Powers, particularly the United States boycott of oil exports to Japan. Pal argued the attacks on neighboring territories were justified to protect the Japanese Empire from an aggressive environment, especially the Soviet Union. He considered that to be self-defense operations which are not criminal. Pal said "the real culprits are not before us" and concluded that "only a lost war is an international crime".

The Emperor's own statements
8 September 1975 TV interview with NBC, USA
 Reporter: "How far has your Majesty been involved in Japan's decision to end the war in 1945? What was the motivation for your launch?"
 Emperor: "Originally, this should be done by the Cabinet. I heard the results, but at the last meeting I asked for a decision. I decided to end the war on my own. (...) I thought that the continuation of the war would only bring more misery to the people."
Interview with Newsweek, USA, 20 September 1975
 Reporter: "(Abbreviation) How do you answer those who claim that your Majesty was also involved in the decision-making process that led Japan to start the war?"
 Emperor: "(Omission) At the start of the war, a cabinet decision was made, and I could not reverse that decision. We believe this is consistent with the provisions of the Imperial Constitution."
22 September 1975 – Press conference with Foreign Correspondents
 Reporter: "How long before the attack on Pearl Harbor did your Majesty know about the attack plan? And did you approve the plan?"
 Emperor: "It is true that I had received information on military operations in advance. However, I only received those reports after the military commanders made detailed decisions. Regarding issues of political character and military command, I believe that I acted in accordance with the provisions of the Constitution."
On 31 October 1975, a press conference was held immediately after returning to the United States after visiting Japan.
 Question: "Your majesty, at your White House banquet you said, 'I deeply deplore that unfortunate war.' (See also .) Does your majesty feel responsibility for the war itself, including the opening of hostilities? Also, what does your majesty think about so-called war responsibility?" (The Times reporter)
 Emperor:  "I can't answer that kind of question because I haven't thoroughly studied the literature in this field, and so don't really appreciate the nuances of your words."
 Question: "How did you understand that the atomic bomb was dropped on Hiroshima at the end of the war?" (RCC Broadcasting Reporter)
 Emperor: "I am sorry that the atomic bomb was dropped, but because of this war, I feel sorry for the citizens of Hiroshima, but I think it is unavoidable."
17 April 1981 Press conference with the presidents of the press
 Reporter: "What was the most enjoyable of your memories of eighty years?"
But I was too particular about it to prevent the war. I made my own decisions twice (February 26 Incident and the end of World War II)."

British government assessment of Hirohito
A January 1989 declassified British government assessment of Hirohito said the Emperor was "uneasy with Japan's drift to war in the 1930s and 1940s but was too weak to alter the course of events." The dispatch by John Whitehead, former ambassador of the United Kingdom to Japan, to Foreign Secretary Geoffrey Howe was declassified on Thursday 20 July 2017 at the National Archives in London. The letter was written shortly after Hirohito's death.
Britain's ambassador to Japan John Whitehead stated in 1989:

Whitehead concludes that ultimately Hirohito was "powerless" and comparisons with Hitler are "ridiculously wide off the mark." If Hirohito acted too insistently with his views he could have been isolated or replaced with a more pliant member of the royal family. The pre-war Meiji Constitution defined the emperor as "sacred" and all-powerful, but according to Whitehead, Hirohito's power was limited by ministers and the military. Whitehead explained after World War II that Hirohito's humility was fundamental for the Japanese people to accept the new 1947 constitution and allied occupation.

Postwar reign

As the Emperor chose his uncle Prince Higashikuni as prime minister to assist the American occupation, there were attempts by numerous leaders to have him put on trial for alleged war crimes. Many members of the imperial family, such as Princes Chichibu, Takamatsu, and Higashikuni, pressured the Emperor to abdicate so that one of the Princes could serve as regent until Crown Prince Akihito came of age. On 27 February 1946, the Emperor's youngest brother, Prince Mikasa, even stood up in the privy council and indirectly urged the Emperor to step down and accept responsibility for Japan's defeat. According to Minister of Welfare Ashida's diary, "Everyone seemed to ponder Mikasa's words. Never have I seen His Majesty's face so pale."

U.S. General Douglas MacArthur insisted that Emperor Hirohito retain the throne. MacArthur saw the Emperor as a symbol of the continuity and cohesion of the Japanese people. Some historians criticize the decision to exonerate the Emperor and all members of the imperial family who were implicated in the war, such as Prince Chichibu, Prince Asaka, Prince Higashikuni, and Prince Hiroyasu Fushimi, from criminal prosecutions.

Before the war crime trials actually convened, the Supreme Commander of the Allied Powers, its International Prosecution Section (IPS) and Japanese officials worked behind the scenes not only to prevent the Imperial family from being indicted, but also to influence the testimony of the defendants to ensure that no one implicated the Emperor. High officials in court circles and the Japanese government collaborated with Allied General Headquarters in compiling lists of prospective war criminals, while the individuals arrested as Class A suspects and incarcerated solemnly vowed to protect their sovereign against any possible taint of war responsibility. Thus, "months before the Tokyo tribunal commenced, MacArthur's highest subordinates were working to attribute ultimate responsibility for Pearl Harbor to Hideki Tōjō" by allowing "the major criminal suspects to coordinate their stories so that the Emperor would be spared from indictment." According to John W. Dower, "This successful campaign to absolve the Emperor of war responsibility knew no bounds. Hirohito was not merely presented as being innocent of any formal acts that might make him culpable to indictment as a war criminal, he was turned into an almost saintly figure who did not even bear moral responsibility for the war." According to Bix, "MacArthur's truly extraordinary measures to save Hirohito from trial as a war criminal had a lasting and profoundly distorting impact on Japanese understanding of the lost war."

Imperial status

Hirohito was not put on trial, but he was forced to explicitly reject the quasi-official claim that the Emperor of Japan was an arahitogami, i.e., an incarnate divinity. This was motivated by the fact that, according to the Japanese constitution of 1889, the Emperor had a divine power over his country which was derived from the Shinto belief that the Japanese Imperial Family were the descendants of the sun goddess Amaterasu. Hirohito was however persistent in the idea that the Emperor of Japan should be considered a descendant of the gods. In December 1945, he told his vice-grand-chamberlain Michio Kinoshita: "It is permissible to say that the idea that the Japanese are descendants of the gods is a false conception; but it is absolutely impermissible to call chimerical the idea that the Emperor is a descendant of the gods." In any case, the "renunciation of divinity" was noted more by foreigners than by Japanese, and seems to have been intended for the consumption of the former. The theory of a constitutional monarchy had already had some proponents in Japan. In 1935, when Tatsukichi Minobe advocated the theory that sovereignty resides in the state, of which the Emperor is just an organ (the tennō kikan setsu), it caused a furor. He was forced to resign from the House of Peers and his post at the Tokyo Imperial University, his books were banned, and an attempt was made on his life. Not until 1946 was the tremendous step made to alter the Emperor's title from "imperial sovereign" to "constitutional monarch."

Although the Emperor had supposedly repudiated claims to divinity, his public position was deliberately left vague, partly because General MacArthur thought him probable to be a useful partner to get the Japanese to accept the occupation and partly due to behind-the-scenes maneuvering by Shigeru Yoshida to thwart attempts to cast him as a European-style monarch.

Nevertheless, Hirohito's status as a limited constitutional monarch was formalized with the enactment of the 1947 Constitution–officially, an amendment to the Meiji Constitution. It defined the Emperor as "the symbol of the state and the unity of the people," and stripped him of even nominal power in government matters. His role was limited to matters of state as delineated in the Constitution, and in most cases his actions in that realm were carried out in accordance with the binding instructions of the Cabinet.

Following the Iranian Revolution and the end of the short-lived Central African Empire, both in 1979, Hirohito found himself the last monarch in the world to bear any variation of the highest royal title "emperor."

Public figure

For the rest of his life, Hirohito was an active figure in Japanese life and performed many of the duties commonly associated with a constitutional head of state. He and his family maintained a strong public presence, often holding public walkabouts and making public appearances at special events and ceremonies. For example, in 1947, the Emperor made a public visit to Hiroshima and held a speech in front of a massive crowd encouraging the city's citizens. He also played an important role in rebuilding Japan's diplomatic image, traveling abroad to meet with many foreign leaders, including Queen Elizabeth II (1971) and President Gerald Ford (1975). He was not only the first reigning emperor to travel beyond Japan, but also the first to meet a President of the United States. His status and image became strongly positive in the United States.

Visit to Europe

In 1971 (Shōwa 46), the Emperor visited seven European countries, including the United Kingdom, the Netherlands, and Switzerland again, for 17 days from 27 September to 14 October. In this case, a special aircraft Douglas DC-8 of Japan Airlines was used unlike the previous visit by ship. Although not counted as a visit, at that time, the Emperor stopped by Anchorage, Alaska as a stopover, and met with United States President Richard Nixon from Washington, DC, at the Alaska District Army Command House at Elmendorf Air Force Base.

The talks between Emperor Shōwa and President Nixon were not planned at the outset, because initially the stop in the United States was only for refueling to visit Europe. However, the meeting was decided in a hurry at the request of the United States. Although the Japanese side accepted the request, Minister for Foreign Affairs Takeo Fukuda made a public telephone call to the Japanese ambassador to the United States Nobuhiko Ushiba, who promoted talks, saying, "that will cause me a great deal of trouble. We want to correct the perceptions of the other party." At that time, Foreign Minister Fukuda was worried that President Nixon's talks with the Emperor would be used to repair the deteriorating Japan–U.S. relations, and he was concerned that the premise of the symbolic emperor system could fluctuate.

There was an early visit, with deep royal exchanges in Denmark and Belgium, and in France they were warmly welcomed. In France, Hirohito reunited with Edward VIII, who had abdicated in 1936 and was virtually in exile, and they chatted for a while. However, protests were held in Britain and the Netherlands by veterans who had served in the South-East Asian theatre and civilian victims of the brutal occupation there. In the Netherlands, raw eggs and vacuum flasks were thrown. The protest was so severe that Empress Kōjun, who accompanied the Emperor, was exhausted. In the United Kingdom, protestors stood in silence and turned their backs when the Emperor's carriage passed them while others wore red gloves to symbolize the dead. The satirical magazine Private Eye used a racist double entendre to refer to the emperor's visit ("nasty Nip in the air"). In West Germany, the Japanese monarch's visit was met with hostile far-left protests, participants of which viewed Hirohito as the East Asian equivalent of Adolf Hitler and referred to him as "Hirohitler", and prompted a wider comparative discussion of the memory and perception of Axis war crimes. The protests against Hirohito's visit also condemned and highlighted what they perceived as mutual Japanese and West German complicity in and enabling of the American war effort against communism in Vietnam.

Regarding these protests and opposition, Emperor Shōwa was not surprised to have received a report in advance at a press conference on 12 November after returning to Japan and said that "I do not think that welcome can be ignored" from each country. Also, at a press conference following their golden wedding anniversary three years later, along with the Empress, he mentioned this visit to Europe as his most enjoyable memory in 50 years.

Visit to the United States

In 1975, the Emperor was invited to visit the United States for 14 days from 30 September to 14 October, at the invitation of President Gerald Ford. The visit was the first such event in US–Japanese history. The United States Army, Navy and Air Force, as well as the Marine Corps and the Coast Guard honored the state visit. Before and after the visit, a series of terrorist attacks in Japan were caused by anti-American left-wing organizations such as the East Asia Anti-Japan Armed Front.

After arriving in Williamsburg on 30 September 1975, Emperor Shōwa stayed in the United States for two weeks. The official meeting with President Ford occurred on 2 October. On 3 October, the Emperor visited Arlington National Cemetery. On 6 October, Emperor Hirohito and Empress Nagako visited Vice President and Mrs. Rockefeller at their home in Westchester County, New York. 

In a speech at the White House state dinner, Hirohito read, "Thanks to the United States for helping to rebuild Japan after the war." During his stay in Los Angeles, he visited Disneyland, and a smiling photo next to Mickey Mouse adorned the newspapers, and there was talk about the purchase of a Mickey Mouse watch. Two types of commemorative stamps and stamp sheets were issued on the day of their return to Japan  which demonstrated that the visit had been a significant undertaking. This was the last visit of Emperor Shōwa to the United States. The official press conference held by the Emperor and Empress before and after their visit also marked a breakthrough.

Marine biology

The Emperor was deeply interested in and well-informed about marine biology, and the Imperial Palace contained a laboratory from which the Emperor published several papers in the field under his personal name "Hirohito." His contributions included the description of several dozen species of Hydrozoa new to science.

Yasukuni Shrine
The Emperor maintained an official boycott of the Yasukuni Shrine after it was revealed to him that Class-A war criminals had secretly been enshrined after its post-war rededication. This boycott lasted from 1978 until his death and has been continued by his successors, Akihito and Naruhito.

On 20 July 2006, Nihon Keizai Shimbun published a front-page article about the discovery of a memorandum detailing the reason that the Emperor stopped visiting Yasukuni. The memorandum, kept by former chief of Imperial Household Agency Tomohiko Tomita, confirms for the first time that the enshrinement of 14 Class-A war criminals in Yasukuni was the reason for the boycott. Tomita recorded in detail the contents of his conversations with the Emperor in his diaries and notebooks. According to the memorandum, in 1988, the Emperor expressed his strong displeasure at the decision made by Yasukuni Shrine to include Class-A war criminals in the list of war dead honored there by saying, "At some point, Class-A criminals became enshrined, including Matsuoka and Shiratori. I heard Tsukuba acted cautiously." Tsukuba is believed to refer to Fujimaro Tsukuba, the former chief Yasukuni priest at the time, who decided not to enshrine the war criminals despite having received in 1966 the list of war dead compiled by the government. "What's on the mind of Matsudaira's son, who is the current head priest?" "Matsudaira had a strong wish for peace, but the child didn't know the parent's heart. That's why I have not visited the shrine since. This is my heart." Matsudaira is believed to refer to Yoshitami Matsudaira, who was the grand steward of the Imperial Household immediately after the end of World War II. His son, Nagayoshi, succeeded Fujimaro Tsukuba as the chief priest of Yasukuni and decided to enshrine the war criminals in 1978. Nagayoshi Matsudaira died in 2006, which some commentators  have speculated is the reason for release of the memo.

Death and state funeral

On 22 September 1987, the Emperor underwent surgery on his pancreas after having digestive problems for several months. The doctors discovered that he had duodenal cancer. The Emperor appeared to be making a full recovery for several months after the surgery. About a year later, however, on 19 September 1988, he collapsed in his palace, and his health worsened over the next several months as he suffered from continuous internal bleeding.

The Emperor died at 6:33 am on 7 January 1989 at the age of 87. The announcement from the grand steward of Japan's Imperial Household Agency, Shoichi Fujimori, revealed details about his cancer for the first time. Hirohito was survived by his wife, his five surviving children, ten grandchildren, and one great-grandchild.

At the time of his death he was both the longest-lived and longest-reigning historical Japanese emperor, as well as the longest-reigning monarch in the world at that time. The latter distinction passed to king Bhumibol Adulyadej of Thailand when he surpassed him in July 2008 until his own death on 13 October 2016.

The Emperor was succeeded by his eldest son, Akihito, whose enthronement ceremony was held on 12 November 1990.

The Emperor's death ended the Shōwa era. On the same day a new era began: the Heisei era, effective at midnight the following day. From 7 January until 31 January, the Emperor's formal appellation was "Departed Emperor" (大行天皇, Taikō-tennō). His definitive posthumous name, Shōwa Tennō (昭和天皇), was determined on 13 January and formally released on 31 January by Noboru Takeshita, the prime minister.

On 24 February, the Emperor's state funeral was held, and unlike that of his predecessor, it was formal but not conducted in a strictly Shinto manner. A large number of world leaders attended the funeral. Hirohito is buried in the Musashi Imperial Graveyard in Hachiōji, alongside his wife and his parents.

Titles, styles, honours and arms

Military appointments
 Grand Marshal and Supreme Commander-in-Chief of the Empire of Japan, 25 December 1926 – upon ascending the throne

Foreign military appointments
 : Honorary General in the British Army, May 1921
 : Field-Marshal of the Regular Army in the British Army, June 1930

National honours
 Founder of the Order of Culture, 11 February 1937

Foreign honours

 : Grand Cross of the Order of Merit of the Federal Republic of Germany, Special Class (GCBVO)
 : Grand Cross of the Order of the White Rose of Finland, with Collar, 1942
 : Grand Cross of the Royal Norwegian Order of Saint Olav (StkStOO), with Collar, 26 September 1922
 : Knight of the Royal Order of the Seraphim (RSerafO), with Collar, 8 May 1919
 : Knight of the Order of the Elephant (RE), 24 January 1923
 : Knight of the Order of the White Eagle, 1922
 : Knight of the Most Auspicious Order of the Rajamitrabhorn (KRMBh), 27 May 1963
 : Knight of the Most Illustrious Order of the Royal House of Chakri (KMChk), 30 January 1925
 : Member of the Most Glorious Order of Ojaswi Rajanya, 19 April 1960
 : Grand Collar of the Order of Sikatuna, 28 September 1966
 : Grand Cross of the National Order of the Southern Cross, 1955
  Italian Royal Family: Knight of the Supreme Order of the Most Holy Annunciation, 31 October 1916
 : Grand Cross of the Order of Merit of the Italian Republic (OMRI), with Collar, 9 March 1982
 : Grand Cordon of the Order of Leopold
 : Honorary Member of the Order of the Crown of the Realm (DMN), 1964
 : Grand Cross of the Royal Order of Pouono (KGCCP), with Collar
 : Honorary Knight Grand Cross of the Royal Victorian Order (GCVO), May 1921
 : Honorary Knight Grand Cross of the Most Honourable Order of the Bath (civil division) (GCB), May 1921
 : Stranger Knight of the Most Noble Order of the Garter (KG), 3 May 1929; revoked, 1941; restored, 22 May 1971
 : Foreign Member of the Royal Society (ForMemRS), 1971
 : Member of the Order of the Crown of Brunei, 1st Class
 : Knight of the Order of the Golden Fleece, 6 October 1928
  Spain: Grand Cross of the Royal and Distinguished Order of Charles III, with Collar, 4 June 1923
  Greek Royal Family: Grand Cross of the Order of the Redeemer
  Greek Royal Family: Grand Cross of the Royal Family Order of Saints George and Constantine, with Collar
 : Collar of the Order of the White Lion, 1928
  Ethiopian Imperial Family: Collar of the Order of Solomon
  Russian Imperial Family: Knight of the Order of Saint Andrew the Apostle the First-called, September 1916

Issue
Emperor Shōwa and Empress Kōjun had seven children, two sons and five daughters.

Scientific publications
 (1967) A review of the hydroids of the family Clathrozonidae with description of a new genus and species from Japan.
 (1969) Some hydroids from the Amakusa Islands.
 (1971) Additional notes on Clathrozoon wilsoni Spencer.
 (1974) Some hydrozoans of the Bonin Islands.
 (1977) Five hydroid species from the Gulf of Aqaba, Red Sea.
 (1983) Hydroids from Izu Oshima and Nijima.
 (1984) A new hydroid Hydractinia bayeri n. sp. (family Hydractiniidae) from the Bay of Panama.
 (1988) The hydroids of Sagami Bay collected by His Majesty the Emperor of Japan.
 (1995) The hydroids of Sagami Bay II. (posthumous)

See also
 Japanese nationalism
 Otoya Yamaguchi
 The Sun – a biographical film about the Emperor

Notes

References

Citations

Sources

  A controversial book that posited Hirohito as a more active protagonist of World War II than publicly portrayed; it contributed to the re-appraisal of his role.
  Winner of the 2001 Pulitzer Prize for General Non-Fiction and the 2000 National Book Critics Circle Award for Biography.
  awarded Pulitzer Prize and National Book Award.
 
 Fujiwara, Akira, Shōwa Tennō no Jū-go Nen Sensō (Shōwa Emperor's Fifteen-year War), Aoki Shoten, 1991.  (Based on the primary sources)
 Hidenari, Terasaki Shōwa tennō dokuhakuroku, Bungei Shūnjusha, 1991
 
 
 Laquerre, Paul-Yanic Showa: Chronicles of a Fallen God,  
 Mosley, Leonard Hirohito, Emperor of Japan, Prentice-Hall, Englewood Cliffs, 1966. , The first full-length biography, it gives his basic story.
 Pike, Francis. Hirohito's War: The Pacific War, 1941–1945 (2016) 1208pp.

Further reading
 Brands, Hal. "The Emperor's New Clothes: American Views of Hirohito after World War II." Historian 68#1 pp. 1–28. online
 Wilson, Sandra. "Enthroning Hirohito: Culture and Nation in 1920s Japan" Journal of Japanese Studies 37#2 (2011), pp. 289–323. online

External links
 
 
 
 Emperor Shōwa and Empress Kōjun at the Imperial Household Agency website
 Reflections on Emperor Hirohito's death
 
 

 
Japanese emperors
1901 births
1989 deaths
 
02
01
Japanese anti-communists
Sons of emperors
Japanese marine biologists
Japanese people of World War II
Japanese princes
Japanese Shintoists
People from Tokyo
Regents of Japan
Sesshō and Kampaku
British field marshals
World War II political leaders
Deaths from cancer in Japan
Deaths from small intestine cancer
Recipients of the Order of the Rising Sun with Paulownia Flowers
Recipients of the Order of the Sacred Treasure, 1st class
Recipients of the Order of Culture
Extra Knights Companion of the Garter
Fellows of the Royal Society (Statute 12)
Knights of the Golden Fleece of Spain
Knights Grand Cross with Collar of the Order of Merit of the Italian Republic
Grand Crosses Special Class of the Order of Merit of the Federal Republic of Germany
Collars of the Order of Saints George and Constantine
Honorary Knights Grand Cross of the Royal Victorian Order
Honorary Knights Grand Cross of the Order of the Bath
Collars of the Order of the White Lion
Recipients of the Order of the White Eagle (Poland)
20th-century Japanese monarchs
20th-century Japanese zoologists
Recipients of orders, decorations, and medals of Ethiopia